The Heldeberg Marathon, also called the Blue Heron Marathon, is an American powered parachute, that was designed and produced by Heldeberg Designs of Altamont, New York.

Design and development
The Marathon was designed to comply with the US FAR 103 Ultralight Vehicles two-seat trainer rules and today is marketed as a light-sport aircraft. It features a parachute-style high-wing, two-seats-in-tandem accommodation, tricycle landing gear and originally a single  Rotax 503 engine in pusher configuration. The  Rotax 582 was the standard engine used on later models.

The aircraft is built from a combination of bolted dural aluminium and stainless steel tubing. It features a double ring propeller guard that has been roll-over tested. The  fuel tank is made from aluminium. In flight steering is accomplished via foot pedals, or optionally a control stick, that actuate the canopy brakes, creating roll and yaw. On the ground the aircraft has lever-controlled nosewheel steering. The main landing gear incorporates gas strut suspension. The aircraft is factory supplied in the form of an assembly kit that requires 30–50 hours to complete.

Originally marketed by the factory under their own name, the aircraft was later marketed under the brand name Blue Heron, although the manufacturer remained the same.

Specifications (Blue Heron Marathon)

References

External links

1990s United States ultralight aircraft
Single-engined pusher aircraft
Powered parachutes